Kathleen Mae Doyle (born June 11, 1998) is an American professional basketball player who previously played in the Women's National Basketball Association (WNBA). She played college basketball for the Iowa Hawkeyes. After a successful college career with Iowa, Doyle was drafted by the Fever with the 14th overall pick in the 2nd round of the 2020 WNBA Draft.

Growing up in the Chicago suburb of La Grange Park, Illinois, she attended Benet Academy in another suburb, Lisle, where she led the Redwings to state championships in her final two seasons in 2015 and 2016.

A member of the All-Big Ten freshman team in 2017, and a three-time All-Big Ten selection (second team by coaches in 2018, first team by coaches and second team by media in 2019, and first team by both in 2020), she was named Big Ten Player of the Year in her senior (final) season in 2020. During her time at Iowa, Doyle also represented the US at the 2019 Pan American Games, winning a silver medal with Team USA.

Career statistics

College
Source

WNBA
Source

|-
| style="text-align:left;"| 2020
| style="text-align:left;"| Indiana
| 18 || 0 || 8.6 || .244 || .238 || .500 || .8 || 1.1 || .4 || .0 || 1.0 || 1.5

References

External links
 Iowa Hawkeyes bio

1998 births
Living people
All-American college women's basketball players
American women's basketball players
Basketball players at the 2019 Pan American Games
Basketball players from Illinois
Benet Academy alumni
Indiana Fever draft picks
Indiana Fever players
Iowa Hawkeyes women's basketball players
Medalists at the 2019 Pan American Games
Pan American Games medalists in basketball
Pan American Games silver medalists for the United States
People from Hinsdale, Illinois
Point guards
Sportspeople from Cook County, Illinois
United States women's national basketball team players